Byron Heights is a mountain rising to  at the northwest extremity of West Falkland, Falkland Islands in the South Atlantic.

The mountain's top is occupied by RRH Byron Heights (Remote Radar Head Byron Heights) of the British Forces South Atlantic Islands (BFSAI), part of an early warning and airspace control network including also RRH Mount Alice on West Falkland and RRH Mount Kent on East Falkland.

References

Mountains of West Falkland
Military of the Falkland Islands